Pope Peter II may refer to:

 Pope Peter II of Alexandria, Patriarch of Alexandria from 373 to 381
 Manuel Corral, leader of the Palmarian Christian Church from 2005 to 2011 under the title Pope Peter II
 Peter the Roman, a future pope mentioned in the Prophecy of the Popes